Máximo Cortés (born 13 April 1988 in Móstoles, Madrid) is a Spanish racing driver who competes in single seater formulae.

Career

Formula Three
After a first successful season in the Master Junior Formula, finishing the season as runner-up, Cortés graduated to Spanish Formula Three Championship in 2006 with Spanish team Escuderia TEC-Auto. A strong third place in the standings in his rookie year boost him as the favorite for the followed season.

Cortés continued with TEC Auto into the 2007 season. During the season he took nine podiums, including six race wins, to win the drivers' title ahead of his teammate Marco Barba, winning the title by just four points.

World Series by Renault
In 2008, Cortés signed with Pons Racing in order to participate in the Formula Renault 3.5 Series alongside fellow Spanish Formula Three teammate Marcos Martínez.

After only seven races in the championship, Máximo was replaced by Aleix Alcaraz due to financial problems; during his short stint in the championship, Cortés finished two times in the points positions, a seven in Spa being his best result.

Racing record

 * Season still in progress

Complete Formula Renault 3.5 Series results
(key) (Races in bold indicate pole position) (Races in italics indicate fastest lap)

References

External links
 Máximo Cortés career statistics at Driver Database

1988 births
Living people
Spanish racing drivers
Euroformula Open Championship drivers
European Le Mans Series drivers
World Series Formula V8 3.5 drivers
International GT Open drivers

Drivex drivers
Pons Racing drivers
Superleague Formula drivers
De Villota Motorsport drivers